The OMEGA Light Heavyweight Championship was the top light heavyweight title in the Organization of Modern Extreme Grappling Arts independent professional wrestling promotion. The title lasted from 1997 to 1999.

Title history

Combined reigns

References

External links
 OMEGA Light Heavyweight Championship

Wrestling competitions